Kawęczynek may refer to the following places:
Kawęczynek, Łódź Voivodeship (central Poland)
Kawęczynek, Lublin Voivodeship (east Poland)
Kawęczynek, Masovian Voivodeship (east-central Poland)